Döng-Talaa is a village in the Issyk-Kul Region of Kyrgyzstan. It is part of the Tong District. Its population was 1,055 in 2021.

References

Populated places in Issyk-Kul Region